In Greek mythology, Europa (Eurṓpē) was a Phoenician princess of Argive Greek origin, and the mother of King Minos of Crete. The continent of Europe may be named after her. The story of her abduction by Zeus in the form of a bull was a Cretan story; as classicist Károly Kerényi points out, "most of the love-stories concerning Zeus originated from more ancient tales describing his marriages with goddesses. This can especially be said of the story of Europa."

Europa's earliest literary reference is in the Iliad, which is commonly dated to the 8th century BC. Another early reference to her is in a fragment of the Hesiodic Catalogue of Women, discovered at Oxyrhynchus. The earliest vase-painting securely identifiable as Europa dates from the mid-7th century BC.

Etymology

Greek  (Eurṓpē)  contains the elements  εὐρύς (eurus),  "wide, broad" and ὤψ/ὠπ-/ὀπτ- (ōps/ōp-/opt-)  "eye, face, countenance". Broad has been an epithet of Earth herself in the reconstructed Proto-Indo-European religion. 

It is common in ancient Greek mythology and geography to identify lands or rivers with female figures. Thus, Europa is first used in a geographic context in the Homeric Hymn to Delian Apollo, in reference to the western shore of the Aegean Sea.
As a name for a part of the known world, it is first used in the 6th century BC by Anaximander and Hecataeus.
The weakness of an etymology with εὐρύς (eurus), is 1. that the -u stem of εὐρύς disappears in Εὐρώπη Europa and 2. the expected form εὐρυώπη euryopa that retains the -u stem in fact exists.  

An alternative suggestion due to Ernest Klein and Giovanni Semerano (1966) attempted to connect a Semitic term for "west", Akkadian erebu meaning "to go down, set" (in reference to the sun), Phoenician  'ereb "evening; west", which would parallel occident (the resemblance to Erebus, from PIE *h1regʷos, "darkness", is accidental, however). Barry (1999) adduces the word Ereb on an Assyrian stele with the meaning of "night", "[the country of] sunset", in opposition to Asu "[the country of] sunrise", i.e. Asia (Anatolia coming equally from Ἀνατολή, "(sun)rise", "east").  This proposal is mostly considered unlikely or untenable.

Family

Sources differ in details regarding Europa's family, but agree that she is Phoenician, and from an Argive lineage that ultimately descended from the princess Io, the mythical nymph beloved of Zeus, who was transformed into a heifer. She is generally said to be the daughter of Agenor, the Phoenician King of Tyre; the Syracusan poet Moschus makes her mother Queen Telephassa ("far-shining") but elsewhere her mother is Argiope ("silver-faced"). Other sources, such as the Iliad, claim that she is the daughter of Agenor's son, the "sun-red" Phoenix. It is generally agreed that she had two brothers, Cadmus, who brought the alphabet to mainland Greece, and Cilix who gave his name to Cilicia in Asia Minor, with the author of Bibliotheke including Phoenix as a third. So some interpret this as her brother Phoenix (when he is assumed to be son of Agenor) gave his siblings' name to his three children and this Europa (by this case, niece of former) is also loved by Zeus, but because of the same name, gave some confusions to others. After arriving in Crete, Europa had three sons fathered by Zeus: Minos, Rhadamanthus, and Sarpedon, the first two becoming judges of the Underworld, alongside Aeacus of Aegina, when they died. In Crete she married Asterion also rendered Asterius and became mother (or step-mother) of his daughter Crete. Pausanias wrote that the poet Praxilla makes Carnus a son of Europa.

Mythology 

The Dictionary of Classical Mythology explains that Zeus was enamoured of Europa and decided to seduce or rape her, the two being near-equivalent in Greek myth. He transformed himself into a tame white bull and mixed in with her father's herds. While Europa and her helpers were gathering flowers, she saw the bull, caressed his flanks, and eventually got onto his back. Zeus took that opportunity and ran to the sea and swam, with her on his back, to the island of Crete. He then revealed his true identity, and Europa became the first queen of Crete. Zeus gave her a necklace made by Hephaestus and three additional gifts: the bronze automaton guard Talos, the hound Laelaps who never failed to catch his quarry, and a javelin that never missed. Zeus later re-created the shape of the white bull in the stars, which is now known as the constellation Taurus. It should not be confused with the Cretan Bull that fathered the Minotaur and was captured by Heracles. Roman mythology adopted the tale of the Raptus, also known as "The Abduction of Europa" and "The Seduction of Europa", substituting the god Jupiter for Zeus.

The myth of Europa and Zeus may have its origin in a sacred union between the Phoenician deities `Aštar and `Aštart (Astarte), in bovine form. Having given birth to three sons by Zeus, Europa married a king Asterios, this being also the name of the Minotaur and an epithet of Zeus, likely derived from the name `Aštar.

According to Herodotus' rationalizing approach, Europa was kidnapped by Greeks (probably Cretans), who were seeking to avenge the kidnapping of Io, a princess from Argos. His variant story may have been an attempt to rationalize the earlier myth; or the present myth may be a garbled version of facts—the abduction of a Phoenician aristocrat—later enunciated without gloss by Herodotus.

Cult

Astarte and Europa
In the territory of Phoenician Sidon, Lucian of Samosata (2nd century AD) was informed that the temple of Astarte, whom Lucian equated with the moon goddess, was sacred to Europa:

 There is likewise in Phœnicia a temple of great size owned by the Sidonians. They call it the temple of Astarte. I hold this Astarte to be no other than the moon-goddess. But according to the story of one of the priests this temple is sacred to Europa, the sister of Cadmus. She was the daughter of Agenor, and on her disappearance from Earth the Phœnicians honoured her with a temple and told a sacred legend about her; how that Zeus was enamoured of her for her beauty, and changing his form into that of a bull carried her off into Crete. This legend I heard from other Phœnicians as well; and the coinage current among the Sidonians bears upon it the effigy of Europa sitting upon a bull, none other than Zeus. Thus they do not agree that the temple in question is sacred to Europa. 

The paradox, as it seemed to Lucian, would be solved if Europa is Astarte in her guise as the full, "broad-faced" moon.

Interpretation 
There were two competing myths relating how Europa came into the Hellenic world, but they agreed that she came to Crete (Kríti), where the sacred bull was paramount. In the more familiar telling she was seduced by the god Zeus in the form of a bull, who breathed from his mouth a saffron crocus and carried her away to Crete on his back—to be welcomed by Asterion, but according to the more literal, euhemerist version that begins the account of Persian-Hellene confrontations of Herodotus, she was kidnapped by Cretans, who likewise were said to have taken her to Crete. The mythical Europa cannot be separated from the mythology of the sacred bull, which had been worshipped in the Levant.  In 2012, an archaeological mission of the British Museum led by Lebanese archaeologist, Claude Doumet Serhal, discovered at the site of the old American school in Sidon, Lebanon currency that depicts Europa riding the bull with her veil flying all over like a bow, further proof of Europa's Phoenician origin.

Europa does not seem to have been venerated directly in cult anywhere in classical Greece, but at Lebadaea in Boeotia, Pausanias noted in the 2nd century AD that Europa was the epithet of Demeter—"Demeter whom they surname Europa and say was the nurse of Trophonios"—among the Olympians who were addressed by seekers at the cave sanctuary of Trophonios of Orchomenus, to whom a chthonic cult and oracle were dedicated: "the grove of Trophonios by the river Herkyna ... there is also a sanctuary of Demeter Europa ...  the nurse of Trophonios."

The festival of Hellotia in Crete was celebrated in honour of Europa.

Argive genealogy

In art and literature

Europa provided the substance of a brief Hellenistic epic written in the mid-2nd century BCE by Moschus, a bucolic poet and friend of the Alexandrian grammarian Aristarchus of Samothrace,  born at Syracuse.

In Metamorphoses Book II, the poet Ovid wrote the following depiction of Jupiter's seduction:

His picturesque details belong to anecdote and fable: in all the depictions, whether she straddles the bull, as in archaic vase-paintings or the ruined metope fragment from Sikyon, or sits gracefully sidesaddle as in a mosaic from North Africa, there is no trace of fear. Often Europa steadies herself by touching one of the bull's horns, acquiescing.

Her tale is also mentioned in Nathaniel Hawthorne's Tanglewood Tales. Though his story titled "Dragon's teeth" is largely about Cadmus, it begins with an elaborate albeit toned down version of Europa's abduction by the beautiful bull.

The tale also features as the subject of a poem and film in the Enderby (fictional character) sequence of novels by Anthony Burgess. She is remembered in De Mulieribus Claris, a collection of biographies of historical and mythological women by the Florentine author Giovanni Boccaccio, composed in 136162. It is notable as the first collection devoted exclusively to biographies of women in Western literature.

Gallery

Namesakes

Continent

The name Europe, as a geographical term, was used by Ancient Greek geographers such as Strabo to refer to part of Thrace below the Balkan mountains. Later, under the Roman Empire the name was given to a Thracian province.

It is derived from the Greek word Eurōpē in all Romance languages, Germanic languages, Slavic languages, Baltic languages, Celtic languages, Iranian languages, Uralic languages (Hungarian Európa, Finnish Eurooppa, Estonian Euroopa).

Jürgen Fischer, in Oriens-Occidens-Europa summarized how the name came into use, supplanting the oriens–occidens dichotomy of the later Roman Empire, which was expressive of a divided empire, Latin in the West, Greek in the East.

In the 8th century, ecclesiastical uses of "Europa" for the imperium of Charlemagne provide the source for the modern geographical term.  The first use of the term Europenses, to describe peoples of the Christian, western portion of the continent, appeared in the Hispanic Latin Chronicle of 754, sometimes attributed to an author called Isidore Pacensis in reference to the Battle of Tours fought against Muslim forces.

The European Union has also used Europa as a symbol of pan-Europeanism, notably by naming its web portal after her and depicting her on the Greek €2 coin and on several gold and silver commemorative coins (e.g. the Belgian €10 European Expansion coin). Her name appeared on postage stamps celebrating the Council of Europe, which were first issued in 1956. The second series of euro banknotes is known as the Europa Series and bears her likeness in the watermark and hologram.

Chemical element

The metal europium, a rare-earth element, was named in 1901 after the continent.

Moon of Jupiter

The invention of the telescope revealed that the planet Jupiter, clearly visible to the naked eye and known to humanity since prehistoric times, has an attendant family of moons. These were named for male and female lovers of the god and other mythological persons associated with him. The smallest of Jupiter's Galilean moons was named after Europa.

Notes

References

Further reading

Primary sources
Isidore, Etymologiae xiv.4.1
Herodotus, The Histories, Book 1.2
Eusebius, Chronicon, 47.7–10, 25, 53.16–17, 55.4–5
Ovid, Metamorphoses, 862, translation by A.D. Melville (1986), p. 50
 Metamorphoses, ii.833-iii.2, vi.103–107

Secondary sources
Pseudo-Apollodorus, Bibliotheke, III, i, 1–2
Apollodorus, The Library of Greek Mythology (Oxford World's Classics), translated by Robin Hard, Oxford University Press, 1999.  
Graves, Robert, (1955) 1960. The Greek Myths
D'Europe à l'Europe, I. Le mythe d'Europe dans l'art et la culture de l'antiquité au XVIIIe s. (colloque de Paris, ENS – Ulm, 24–26.04.1997), éd. R. Poignault et O. Wattel — de Croizant,  coll. Caesarodunum, n° XXXI bis, 1998.
 D'Europe à l'Europe, II. Mythe et identité du XIXe s. à nos jours (colloque de Caen, 30.09–02.10.1999), éd. R. Poignault, F. Lecocq et O. Wattel – de Croizant, coll. Caesarodunum, n° XXXIII bis, 2000.
 D’Europe à l’Europe, III. La dimension politique et religieuse du mythe d’Europe de l‘Antiquité à nos jours (colloque de Paris, ENS-Ulm, 29–30.11.2001), éd. O. Wattel — De Croizant, coll. Caesarodunum, n° hors-série, 2002.
 D’Europe à l’Europe, IV. Entre Orient et Occident, du mythe à la géopolitique (colloque de Paris, ENS-Ulm, 18–20.05.2006), dir. O. Wattel — de Croizant & G. de Montifroy, Editions de l’Age d’Homme, Lausanne – Paris, 2007.
 D’Europe à l’Europe, V. État des connaissances (colloque de Bruxelles, 21–22.10.2010), dir. O. Wattel – de Croizant & A. Roba, Bruxelles, éd. Métamorphoses d’Europe asbl, 2011.

External links

A metope from Sicily, carved with Europa, c. 550 – 540 BCE: the bull's face, turned head-on, clearly reveals his Near Eastern iconic antecedents
Europa on the Greek euro coin of €2
www.europesname.eu  A study describing the origin and artistic use of the name EUROPE in its mythical, geographic and political sense by Drs. Peter H. Gommers
 Warburg Institute Iconographic Database (ca 250 images of Europa) 
 

Princesses in Greek mythology
Queens in Greek mythology
Agenorides
Mortal women of Zeus
Mythological rape victims
Metamorphoses characters
Phoenician characters in Greek mythology
Cretan mythology
Europe in mythology
Astarte
National personifications
Symbols of the European Union
Zoophilia in culture